Mohammed Razak is a Ghanaian-born Qatari professional football player who is a forward. Mohammed Razak scored a goal in a friendly game against Bayern Munich for the Qatar national football team on July 9, 2011.

Club career statistics 
Statistics accurate as of 19 April 2013

1Includes Emir of Qatar Cup.
2Includes Sheikh Jassem Cup.
3Includes AFC Champions League.

References

External links 
 

1986 births
Living people
Qatari footballers
Qatar international footballers
Qatar Stars League players
Qatari Second Division players
Muaither SC players
Lekhwiya SC players
Qatar SC players
Al-Shamal SC players
Ghanaian emigrants to Qatar
Naturalised citizens of Qatar
Al-Arabi SC (Qatar) players
Al-Gharafa SC players
Al Kharaitiyat SC players
Association football forwards
Association football midfielders